Tarro railway station is located on the Main Northern line in New South Wales, Australia. It serves the western Newcastle suburb of Tarro, opening on 1 August 1871.

Platforms & services
Tarro has two side platforms. It is serviced by NSW TrainLink Hunter Line services travelling between Newcastle), Maitland and Telarah. It is also service by one early morning service to Scone.

References

External links

Tarro station details Transport for New South Wales

Railway stations in the Hunter Region
Railway stations in Australia opened in 1871
Regional railway stations in New South Wales
Main North railway line, New South Wales